Barbadian Canadian or Bajan Canadian, refers to Canadian citizens of Barbadian descent or Barbados-born people who resides in Canada. According to the 2016 Census 37,780 Canadians claimed full or partial Barbadian ancestry. Barbadian Canadians have the highest median income and the lowest incidence of poverty among Black Canadian groups. Barbadians first start migrating to Nova Scotia in the early 1900s settling largely in the neighbourhood of Whitney Pier in Sydney. In Cape Breton, they established chapters of the United Negro Improvement Association and the African Orthodox Church. As of 2016, over 70% of the Bajan population in Canada resides in Ontario.

Barbadian Canadians by Canadian province or territory (2016)

List of notable Barbadian Canadians

See also
Whitney Pier
Black Nova Scotians
Barbados–Canada relations
List of Canadians by ethnicity
Canadian High Commission to Barbados
Barbadian High Commission to Canada
 List of Barbadian Britons
 List of Barbadian Americans
Barbadian Americans
Barbadian British
Jewish Canadians
Indo-Canadians
Caribbean people
Irish immigration to Barbados
Indians in Barbados
White Barbadian

References

External links

Citizenship and Immigration Canada (CIC) - Government of Canada country profile on Barbados.
Canadian Factsheet on Barbados

 
 
Caribbean Canadian
Ethnic groups in Canada